Shaun is an anglicized spelling of the Irish name Seán. Alternative spellings include Shawn, Sean and Shawne.

Notable persons with the given name include:

People
Shaun (musician) (born 1990), South Korean musician
Shaun (YouTuber), British video essayist   
Shaun Alexander (born 1977), American football player
Shaun Bradley (born 1997), American football player
Shaun Cassidy (born 1958), American television producer/creator, screenwriter, singer and actor
Shaun Chamberlin, English author and activist
Shaun Donovan (born 1966), American politician
Shaun Evans (disambiguation), multiple people
Shaun Johnson (born 1990), New Zealand rugby league footballer
Shaun Jolly (born 1998), American football player
Shaun King (born 1979), American writer and civil rights activist
Shaun King (American football) (born 1977), American football player
Shaun Livingston (born 1985), American basketball player
Shaun Maloney (born 1983), Scottish football coach and former player
Shaun Marsh (born 1983), Australian cricketer
Shaun Morgan Welgemoed (born 1978), South African musician, singer, songwriter and guitarist
Shaun Murphy (disambiguation), multiple people
Shaun Phillips (born 1981), American football player
Shaun Pollock (born 1973), South African cricketer
Shaun Ryder (born 1962), English singer, songwriter and musician
Shaun Smith (disambiguation), multiple people
Shaun Suisham (born 1981), Canadian football player
Shaun Tait (born 1983), Australian cricketer
Shaun Tan (born 1974), Australian artist, writer and filmmaker
Shaun Tomson (born 1955), South African world champion surfer
Shaun Wade (disambiguation), multiple people
Shaun Wallace (born 1960), English barrister and TV personality
Shaun Weatherhead (born 1970), English footballer
Shaun White (born 1986), American snowboarder and skateboarder
Shaun Williams (disambiguation), multiple people
Shaun Wilson (born 1972), Australian artist, film maker, academic and curator
Shaun Wilson (American football) (born 1995), American football player
Shaun Woodward (born 1958), English politician

Fictional characters
 Shaun, a Wallace and Gromit character who was then the protagonist of the British animated series Shaun the Sheep and several films
 Shaun Murphy, the protagonist of the American TV series The Good Doctor
 the protagonist of the 2004 British film Shaun of the Dead
Shaun Evans (One Life to Live), on the American soap opera One Life to Live
 Shaun the Emu from the episode entitled Shaun of children's TV series Bluey

See also
List of people named Sean
Shawn (given name), includes a list of people named Shawn
Shon (given name), includes a list of people named Shon

English-language masculine given names
English masculine given names
Masculine given names